Archdeacon John Batchelor D.D., OBE (20 March 1855 – 2 April 1944) was an Anglican English missionary to the Ainu people of Japan until 1941. First sent under the auspices of the Church Missionary Society of the Church of England, Batchelor lived from 1877 to 1941 among the indigenous Ainu communities in the Northern Japanese island of Hokkaido. He was a charismatic and iconoclastic missionary for the Anglican Church in Japan and published highly regarded work on the language and culture of the Ainu people. Batchelor only reluctantly left Japan at the outbreak of the Second World War in 1941.

Early life and missionary career
John Batchelor was born in Uckfield, East Sussex son of William Batchelor, a local tailor and parish clerk. Batchelor attended Uckfield Grammar School and with the support of the Rev. E.T. Cardale was accepted as a candidate for study at the Church Missionary Society College, Islington.

On 22 September 1875, Batchelor set out with a group of Church Missionary Society (CMS) missionaries for Hong Kong. Arriving in Hong Kong on 11 November 1875 he immediately set about studying the Chinese language. While in Hong Kong Batchelor fell ill to malaria and hearing that the climate in Hokkaido was similar to his native England left for Hokkaido via Yokohama. He left Hong Kong on 31 May 1877, then on 16 July he boarded a freight ship to Hakkodate from Yokahama. In Hakkodate he was assigned as a junior to the senior missionary Walter Dening of the CMS, settling in the city's Motomachi district. It was in Hakodate that he had his first encounter with the Ainu.

Hakodate from 1877  

1877 Batchelor moved to Hokkaido

1884 Batchelor married Louisa Andrews, who had young brother Walter, who was working as a missionary in Hakodate.   

1886 Batchelor moved to the new house in April. That summer, a British Japanologist Basil Hall Chamberlain (1850–1935), professor of Tokyo Imperial University  visited Batchelor's house to write on Ainu and stayed with Batchelor for three weeks. Batchelor took Chamberlain to Ainu villages, which was beneficial to publishing a book on Ainu.

1889 Batchelor wrote Japanese Ainu in English and published Ainu-English-Japanese dictionary.

1891 Batchelor and his colleague Lucy Payne of Anglican Church founded Harutori Ainu school in Kushiro.

Sapporo from 1891
In 1895, a church was constructed at Biratori, the other at near Mount Usu in Hokkaido.

In 1896, Batchelor sent an English nurse and missionary Mary Briant to Biratori.  She stayed in Japan for 22 years

In 1906, Batchelor and his wife adopted an Ainu woman Yaeko (1884–1962).

In 1908, Bachelor went to Sakhalin to preach with Yaeko after the Russo-Japanese War.

In 1909, Bachelor, his wife, and Yaeko temporarily visited England via Vladivostok by the Siberia Railway.

In 1936, Batchelor's wife Louisa died at the age of 91.

In 1941, Batchelor returned to England.

Views on the treatment of the Ainu communities
Batchelor harshly criticised the Japanese for their cruel treatment of the Ainu, saying "I'm past eighty, and probably that accounts for it. But I've been told I'm the only foreigner in Japan who can tell the Japanese exactly what I think of them and get away with it."

The Japanese forced the Ainu from their land and forbade them to practice their traditions and culture, Ainu were not allowed to hunt for food, speak Ainu, or obtain an education, being forcefully segregated in small villages. After Japan realised they could exploit the Ainu they reversed their policy, Batchelor said "The Japanese treat them better now, simply because they came to realize that the Ainu were a valuable curiosity worth preserving. There was no kindness or sentiment in it—none whatever. They quit trying to exterminate this shattered relic of a dying Caucasian race when visitors with money to spend began coming from all over the world just to see and study them. If today the Ainu are protected wards of the Government, and if the Government has paid me any honor, it is not because of a change of heart on the part of the Japanese; it is only because the Ainu became worth something to Japan." During the era of Samurai in Japan, Ainus had to grovel and smear their face on soil when they met a Japanese soldier, or face immediate decapitation. Japan also forbade the ownership of weapons among the Ainu.

Batchelor wrote extensively, both works about the Ainu language and works in Ainu itself.

Works by Batchelor

See also
 Akkorokamui
 Imekanu

References

Further reading
 Jalal, Ibrahim (2021) Hokkaido - A History of Japan's Northern Isle and its People. Earnshaw Books.

External links

John Batchelor at Project Canterbury
SEA-GIRT YEZO  on Project Canterbury
The reason why John Bachelor made his mind to work for the Ainu
Anglican church in Hokkaido

1854 births
1944 deaths
People from Uckfield
English Anglican missionaries
Anthropologists of the Ainu
Holders of a Lambeth degree
Anglican missionaries in Japan
British expatriates in Japan
Church Mission Society missionaries